The Kuatun keelback (Hebius craspedogaster) is a species of snake of the family Colubridae.

Geographic range
The snake is found in China and Vietnam.

References 

Reptiles described in 1899
Hebius

Snakes of China
Snakes of Vietnam
Snakes of Asia
Taxa named by George Albert Boulenger